Muzeum Katyńskie w Warszawie is a museum in Warsaw, Poland. The museum was established in 1993.  It is located in the Polish Army Museum.  Objects, documents and personal effects from the site of the Katyn massacre can be seen in the museum. In 2017 museum was nominated for European Union Prize for Contemporary Architecture award.

References

External links
 
 

Museums in Warsaw
Museums established in 1993
Katyn massacre
Defunct museums in Poland
World War II museums in Poland